The economy of the Haudenosaunee (also known as Iroquois) historically was based on communal production and combined elements of both horticulture and hunter-gatherer systems. Some have described the Iroquois economy as primitive communism. The tribes of the Iroquois Confederacy and other Northern Huron had their traditional territory in what is now New York State and the southern areas bordering the Great Lakes. The confederacy was originally composed of five tribes; the Mohawk, Onondaga, Oneida, Cayuga, and Seneca, who had created an alliance long before European contact. The Tuscarora were added as a sixth nation in the early eighteenth century after they migrated from North Carolina. The Huron peoples, located mostly in what is now Canada, were also Iroquoian-speaking and shared some culture, but were never part of the Iroquois.

The Iroquoian people were predominantly agricultural, harvesting the "Three Sisters" commonly grown by Native American groups: corn, beans, and squash. They developed certain cultural customs. Among these developments were ideas concerning the nature and management of property. The Iroquois developed a system very different from the now-dominant Western variety. This system was characterized by such components as common ownership of land, division of labor by gender, and trade mostly based on gift economy.

Contact with Europeans in the early 17th century had a profound impact on the economy of the Iroquoians. At first, they became important trading partners, but the expansion of European settlement upset the balance of the Iroquois economy. By 1800, following the American Revolutionary War, in which most of the nations supported the British and had to share their defeat, the Iroquois were reduced to reservations, primarily in New York in the United States, and Quebec and Ontario in Canada. They had to adapt their traditional economic system to dramatic changes. In the 20th century, some of the Iroquois nations in the United States have benefited from their sovereign status by founding gambling and recreation facilities, which have yielded greater revenues than some other enterprises. Individually, Iroquois has  also become part of the larger economies in cities off the reservation.

Land ownership 

The Iroquois had an essentially communal system of land ownership. The French Catholic missionary Gabriel Sagard described the fundamentals. The Huron had "as much land as they need[ed]." As a result, the Huron could give families their own land and still have a large amount of excess land owned communally. Any Huron was free to clear the land and farm on the basis of usufruct. He maintained possession of the land as long as he continued to actively cultivate and tend the fields. Once he abandoned the land, it reverted to communal ownership, and anyone could take it up for themselves. While the Huron did seem to have lands designated for the individual, the significance of this possession may be of little relevance; the placement of corn storage vessels in the longhouses, which contained multiple families in one kinship group, suggests the occupants of a given longhouse held all production in common.

The Iroquois had a similar communal system of land distribution. The tribe owned all lands but gave out tracts to the different clans for further distribution among households for cultivation. The land would be redistributed among the households every few years, and a clan could request a redistribution of tracts when the Clan Mothers' Council gathered. Those clans that abused their allocated land or otherwise did not take care of it would be warned and eventually punished by the Clan Mothers' Council by having the land redistributed to another clan. Land property was really only the concern of the women, since it was the women's job to cultivate food and not the men's.

The Clan Mothers' Council also reserved certain areas of land to be worked by the women of all the different clans. Food from such lands, called kěndiǔ"gwǎ'ge' hodi'yěn'tho, would be used at festivals and large council gatherings.

Division of labor: agriculture and forestry 
The division of labor reflected the complementary aspects common in Iroquois culture: The twin gods Sapling (East) and Flint (West) embodied the two complementary halves. Each gender had defined roles in labor to support the people, which complemented each other. Women did all work involving the field, including planting, cultivating and harvesting the crops; while men did all work involving the forest, including the manufacture of anything involving wood. The Iroquois men carried out hunting and fishing, trading, and fighting, while the women took care of farming, food gathering and processing, rearing of children, and housekeeping. This gendered division of labor was the predominant means of dividing work in Iroquois society. At the time of contact with Europeans, Iroquois women produced about 65% of the goods and the men 35%. The combined production of food made famine and hunger extremely rare; early Europeans settlers often envied the success of Iroquois food production.

The Iroquois system of work reflected their communal land system. Since the Iroquois owned property together, they worked together as well. The women performed difficult work in large groups, going from field to field helping one another work each other's land. Together they would sow the fields as a "mistress of the field" distributed a set amount of seeds to each of the women. The Iroquois women of each agricultural group would select an old but active member of their group to act as their leader for that year and agree to follow her directions. The women performed other work cooperatively as well. The women individually cut wood for family use, but their leader would oversee the collective carrying of the wood back to the village. The women's clans performed other work. According to Mary Jemison, a white woman who assimilated with the Seneca while young, the collective effort averted "every jealousy of one having done more or less work than another."

The Iroquois men also organized in a cooperative fashion. The men acted collectively during military actions. The other jobs of men, such as hunting and fishing, also involved cooperative elements. The men more often organized as a whole village rather than as a clan. The men organized hunting parties where they used extensive cooperation to kill a large amount of game. One firsthand account told of a hunting party that built a large brush fence in a forest to form a V. The hunters set a fire across from the open side of the V, forcing the animals to run towards the point where the hunters awaited them. They could kill one hundred deer at a time by such a plan.

The men also fished in large groups. Fishing expeditions included men in canoes using weirs and nets to cover entire streams and harvest large amounts of fish, sometimes a thousand in half of a day. A hunting or fishing party's takings were considered common property; they were divided among the party by the leader or taken to the village for a feast. Hunting and fishing were not always cooperative efforts, but the Iroquois generally did better in parties than as individuals.

Trade 
The Iroquois traded excess corn and tobacco for the pelts from the tribes to the north and the wampum from the tribes to the east. The Iroquois used present-giving more often than any other mode of exchange. Present-giving reflected the reciprocity in Iroquois society. The exchange would begin with one clan giving another tribe or clan a present with the expectation of some sort of needed commodity being given in return. This form of trade ties to the Iroquois culture's tendency to share property and cooperate in labor. In all cases no explicit agreement is made, but one service is performed for the community or another member of the community's good with the expectation that the community or another individual would give back. External trade offered one of the few opportunities for individual enterprise in Iroquois society. A person who discovered a new trading route had the exclusive right to trade along the same route in the future. Often clans collectivized trading routes to gain a monopoly on a certain type of trade.

The arrival of Europeans created the opportunity for greatly expanded trade. Furs were in demand in Europe, and they could be acquired cheaply from Indigenous Peoples in exchange for manufactured goods the Indigenous Peoples could not make themselves. Trade did not always benefit the Natives. The British took advantage of the gift-giving culture. They showered the Iroquois with European goods, making them dependent on such items as rifles and metal axes. For a time, the access to guns gave the Mohawk and other Iroquois advantages over other tribes, and they entered trading seriously. The British primarily used these gifts to gain support among the Iroquois for fighting against the French.

The Iroquois also traded for alcohol, which the Europeans introduced. Eventually, this would have a very negative influence on their society, as they suffered a high rate of alcoholism. By 1753 Scarouady, an Oneida chief, petitioned the Governor of Pennsylvania to intervene in trade: 
"Your Traders now bring scarce anything but Rum and Flour; they bring little powder and lead, or other valuable goods . . . and get all the skins that should go to pay the debts we have contracted for goods bought of the Fair Traders; by this means we not only ruin ourselves but them too. These wicked Whiskey Sellers, when they have once got the Indians in liquor, make them sell their very clothes from their backs. In short, if this practice be continued, we must be inevitably ruined."

Effect on Iroquois culture and society 
The structure of the Iroquois economy created a unique property and work ethic. The threat of theft was almost nonexistent, since little was held by the individual except basic tools and implements that were so prevalent they had little value. The only goods worth stealing would have been wampum. In order for the Iroquois to succeed without an individual incentive, they had to develop a communal work ethic. Virtue became synonymous with productivity. The idealized Iroquois man was a good warrior and productive hunter while the perfect woman excelled in agriculture and housekeeping. By emphasizing an individual's usefulness to society, the Iroquois created a mindset that encouraged their members to contribute even though they received similar benefits no matter how hard they worked.

As a result of their communal system, the Iroquois had a strong tradition of autonomous responsibility. Iroquois men were taught to be self-disciplined, self-reliant, and responsible as well as stoic. The Iroquois attempted to eliminate any feelings of dependency during childhood and foster a desire for responsibility. At the same time, the child would have to participate in a communal culture, children were taught to think as individuals but work for the community.

Land management after the Europeans arrived 
The Iroquois system of land management changed somewhat after encounter with the Europeans. The Mohawk were the first to deal with them and "sold" some land to settlers, although it is unlikely either side understood the other's conception of property.

After the American Revolutionary War, the victorious Americans forced the nations into reservations much reduced in size from their former territories, even those two, the Oneida and Onondaga, that had supported them. Most of the other Iroquois nations were forced to give up their territory and retreated to Canada, where they received some land in compensation from the Crown, in addition to existing settlements along the St. Lawrence River.

The Iroquois had a system of collectively owned land free to be used as needed by their members. While this system was not wholly collective, as land was distributed for use to individual family groups, the Iroquois lacked the Western conception of property as a commodity. Despite the influence of Western culture, the Iroquois have maintained a unique view of property over the years.

The contemporary Mohawk Doug George-Kanentiio sums up his perception of the Iroquois property view: The Iroquois have 
"no absolute right to claim territory for purely monetary purposes. Our Creator gave us our aboriginal lands in trust with very specific rules regarding its uses. We are caretakers of our Mother Earth, not lords of the land. Our claims are valid only so far as we dwell in peace and harmony upon her."

In 1981 the Iroquois Council of Chiefs (or Haudenosaunee) expressed similar ideas. The Council distinguished the 
"Western European concepts of land ownership" from the Iroquois view that "the earth is sacred" and "was created for all to use forever—not to be exploited merely for this present generation." Land is not just a commodity and "In no event is land for sale." The statement continues, "Under Haudenosaunee law, 'Gayanerkowa,' the land is held by the women of each clan. It is principally the women who are responsible for the land, who farm it, and who care for it for the future generations. When the Confederacy was formed, the separate nations formed one union. The territory of each nation became Confederacy land even though each nation continued to have a special interest in its historic territory." The Council's statement reflects its unique view of property among the Iroquois.

The system of the Grand River Iroquois (two Iroquois reservations in Canada) integrated the traditional Iroquois property structure with the new way of life after being confined to a reservation. The reservation was established under two deeds by the Crown in the 18th century following the American Revolutionary War. These deeds gave corporate ownership of the lands to the Six Nations of the Iroquois. Individuals were granted leases for a specific plot by the Confederacy. The Iroquois idea that land came into one's possession if cared for and reverted to public control if left alone was used in reservation property law. In one property dispute case, the Iroquois Council sided with a claimant who had made improvements and cultivated the land over one who had left it alone.

The natural resources of the land are considered to belong to the tribe as a whole and not to those who possessed the particular parcel. The Iroquois leased the right to extract stone from the lands in one instance and fixed royalties on all the production. After natural gas had been discovered on the reservation, the Six Nations took direct ownership of the natural gas wells. They paid persons who had wells on their land compensation only for damages done by gas extraction. This setup closely resembled the precontact land distribution system where the tribes owned the land and distributed it for use, but not unconditional ownership.

Modern economy 

Many Iroquois have been fully integrated into the surrounding Western economy of the United States and Canada. For others, their economic involvement is more isolated in the reservation. Whether directly involved in the outside economy or not, most of the Iroquois economy is now greatly influenced by national and world economies. The Iroquois have been involved in the steel construction industry for over a hundred years, with many men from the Mohawk nations working on such high-steel projects as the Empire State Building and the World Trade Center.

Inside the reservations, which are sometimes isolated from larger cities, the economic situation has often been bleak. For instance, the U.S. side of the Mohawk St. Regis reservation in northern New York has had unemployment as high as 46 percent. However, in April of 1999, the St Regis Mohawks opened the Akwesasne Mohawk Casino. It was renovated in 2011 and 2012 to enlarge the hotel, amenities and gaming floor. The casino also employs tribal members and local community members.

But many reservations have successful businesses. The Seneca reservation contains the City of Salamanca, New York, a center of the hardwoods industry. The Seneca make use of their sovereignty to sell gasoline and cigarettes tax-free and run high-stakes bingo operations. The Senecas have also opened several Indian casinos, the Seneca Niagara Casino in Niagara Falls, New York and one in Salamanca. In 2007 the Seneca opened a third in Buffalo, the Seneca Buffalo Creek Casino.

The Oneida also operate casinos on their reservations in New York and Wisconsin. The Oneida are one of the largest employers in northeastern Wisconsin with over 3,000 employees, including 975 people in tribal government. The Tribe manages more than $16 million in federal and private grants, and a wide range of programs, including those authorized by the Indian Self-Determination and Education Assistance Act. The Oneida business ventures have brought millions of dollars into the community and improved the standard of living in the region.

See also 
 Erie (tribe)
 Neutral Nation
 Primitive communism

Notes

References

External links 
Encyclopedic entry on the Iroquois – contains decent economic information and links to the Iroquois nations
Carnegie Museum of Natural History – The Iroquois of the Northeast – Information on Iroquois including agriculture and steel construction.
A Mohawk Iroquois Village: An Exhibit at the New York State Museum – Dioramas of Iroquois Villages online with text

Iroquois-owned enterprises
Oneida Enterprises – businesses owned by the Oneida nation
Turning Stone Casino – run by the Oneida in Verona, NY.
Seneca Niagara Casino & Hotel – run by the Seneca in Niagara Falls, NY
Seneca Allegany Casino – run by the Seneca in Salamanca, NY.

Iroquois
Economic systems